Steve Williams (born 8 May 1973) is an Australian former racing cyclist. He won the Australian national road race title in 2001.

Major results
1995
 1st NSW State Road Championships
 4th Commonwealth Bank Cycling Classic (Leading Australian)
1997
 3rd Road race, National Road Championships
 3rd Australian Time Trial Championships
 1st NSW State Road Championships
1998
 5th Gran Premio della Liberazione
2000
 1st Stage 4 Herald Sun Tour
 1st NSW State Road Championships
2001
 1st  Road race, National Road Championships
 7th Overall Herald Sun Tour

References

External links

1973 births
Living people
Australian male cyclists
Place of birth missing (living people)